Tom McCall Memorial is an outdoor bronze sculpture of former Oregon Governor Tom McCall by Rip Caswell, located in Salem, Oregon, in the United States.

Description and history 
It was installed along the Willamette River in Riverfront Park, dedicated on September 26, 2008, at a ceremony attended by Governor Ted Kulongoski.

See also

 2008 in art

References

External links
 "Oregon Is An Inspiration" Unit One, Oregon Historical Society
 Statue of Tom McCall Dedicated in Salem Park by Kristian Foden-Vencil, Oregon Public Broadcasting (September 26, 2008)

2008 establishments in Oregon
2008 sculptures
Bronze sculptures in Oregon
Fish in art
Monuments and memorials in Salem, Oregon
Outdoor sculptures in Salem, Oregon
Sculptures of men in Oregon
Statues in Oregon